The Podlaskie Voivodeship Sejmik is the regional legislature of the Voivodeship of Podlaskie. It is a unicameral parliamentary body consisting of thirty councillors elected to a five-year term. The current chairperson of the assembly is Bogusław Dębski.

The assembly elects the executive board that acts as the collective executive for the regional government, headed by the province's marshal. The current Executive Board of Podlaskie is held by the Law and Justice party with Artur Kosicki (PiS) presiding as marshal.

The Regional Assembly meets in the Marshal's Office in Białystok.

Districts 

Members of the Assembly are elected from five districts, serve five-year terms. The districts do not have formal names, instead each constituency has a number and territorial description.

See also 
 Polish Regional Assembly
 Podlaskie Voivodeship

Notes

References

External links 
 (pl) Podlaskie Regional Assembly

Podlaskie
Assembly
Unicameral legislatures